Pfuri, Gorps and Kniri was a Swiss folk/blues music group consisting of Pfuri Baldenweg (born 26 November 1946), Anthony "Gorps" Fischer (1947-2000) and Peter "Kniri" Knaus (born 3 March 1945 in Aarau). The group took part in the 1978 Roskilde Festival and the 1977 & 1979 Montreux Jazz Festival. In 1979 the trio teamed up with Peter, Sue and Marc at the 1979 Eurovision Song Contest with the song "Trödler und Co." (Second-handers and Co.) they finished 10th place with 60 points.

Albums
 Live, 1975
 Montreux Live, 1977
 Sack’n’Roll Band, 1980

Singles
 Cashbox
 Camping
 Trödler und Co. (with Peter, Sue & Marc)

References

External links
 Pfuri, Gorps and Kniri - official fan page
  Pfuri, Gorps and Kniri at mikiwiki

Eurovision Song Contest entrants for Switzerland
Eurovision Song Contest entrants of 1979
Swiss folk music groups